Jean-Pierre Rivère (born September 2, 1957 in Condom, Gers) is a French businessman and chairman of football club OGC Nice. He founded Nice Iselection, a realty software firm that was eventually acquired by Nexity. In 2011, he assumed the chairman's role of OGC Nice.

References

Living people
French businesspeople
1957 births
People from Gers
French football chairmen and investors